"Control" is the debut solo single by German singer Zoe Wees, from her debut EP Golden Wings. It released by Valeria Music on 13 March 2020 as the lead single from the EP. Written by Wees, Patrick Pyke Salmy, Emma Sophia Rosen, Ricardo Muñoz, René Miller, and Nils Bodenstedt, the song is a power ballad and about the singer's anxiety and lack of control due to her struggles with epilepsy.

Background 
After debuting in June 2018 as a featured artist on Moonbootica's single "Hibernating", Wees signed a record deal with the label Valeria Music, a division of Caroline Distribution, and began recording new music in early 2020.

Music video 
The song's official video, directed by Dennis Dirksen, was released on 27 March 2020. As of  December 2022, the video has 75,191,077 views on YouTube<https://www.youtube.com/watch?v=UrGS_6_HglU>.

Commercial performance 
Upon release, the song failed to chart, but in the following months it began to gain popularity on Spotify, entering the viral charts of various European countries. During the summer, "Control" reached in the top 40 of Austria, Belgium, Germany, and Switzerland. In October the song peaked at number 1 on the French Radio Singles Chart; in the same month it was certified gold in Italy for moving  units.

In the United States, after receiving massive airplay, the song peaked at number 22 on the US Mainstream Top 40 and entered the Bubbling Under Hot 100 at number 19 on the chart issue dated 31 October 2020. In September 2021 it was certified gold in the country for moving  units.

Charts

Weekly charts

Year-end charts

Certifications

References 

2020 singles
2020 songs
English songs